From an early age, Queen Elizabeth II took a keen interest in horses. Into her reign, this developed into one of her main leisure time activities with a particular emphasis on the breeding of thoroughbreds for horse racing.

Riding
As a child, Elizabeth was given her first horse, a Shetland pony named Peggy, at age 4; which she was riding by age 6. By age 18, she was an accomplished rider, and continued to ride for pleasure into her nineties.

In her role as monarch, Elizabeth also rode in a ceremonial role. From her first appearance as princess in 1947 and throughout her reign as queen until 1986, she attended the annual Trooping the Colour ceremony on horseback. Initially, she rode a bay police horse named Tommy in 1947. When her father, King George VI, was unwell, she rode in his place on his chestnut horse Winston, and she rode Winston after George VI's death. Later she rode a chestnut horse named Imperial. For eighteen consecutive years, from 1969 to 1986, her horse was a black mare named Burmese. Burmese was a gift from the Royal Canadian Mounted Police. From 1987 onward, since Burmese retired, she would attend in a carriage.

Racing

Her Majesty owned many thoroughbred horses for use in racing, having initially inherited the breeding and racing stock of her late father King George VI, in 1952. Up until the late 1960s she raced her own-bred stock as well as horses bred by the National Stud. Her registered racing colours (termed silks), as worn by the jockeys riding her race horses, are the same as those used by her father and great-grandfather, King Edward VII; a purple and scarlet jacket with gold braiding, with black cap. As of 2013, horses owned by the Queen won over 1,600 races, and excluding the Epsom Derby has won all the British Classic Races, some multiple times. She also won a French Classic, the Prix de Diane in 1974. She was named British flat racing Champion Owner in 1954 and 1957, the first reigning monarch ever to do so twice.

She had a 2nd place runner in the Derby, Aureole, in 1953, the year of her coronation. Her horse Dunfermline won two of the classics, the Epsom Oaks and St. Leger Stakes, in Elizabeth's Silver Jubilee year of 1977. She never gambled and is instead said to have had more interest from the outcome of a successful breeding match, but she is said to have read the Racing Post over breakfast every morning.

Other notable horses owned by Elizabeth include:
 Agreement
 Almeria
 Canisbay
 Carrozza
 Doutelle
 Estimate
 Highclere
 Hopeful Venture
 Magna Carta
 Pall Mall

Horse races named after Elizabeth II include:
 Queen Elizabeth II Challenge Cup Stakes
 Queen Elizabeth II Commemorative Cup
 Queen Elizabeth II Stakes

After the Queen's death, her horses were inherited by her heir and successor, Charles III; the new King had his first winner, Just Fine, at Leicester in October 2022. It was announced later that month that the King was to sell fourteen of the late Queen's horses, including his first winner Just Fine, and the Queen's last winner, Love Affairs.

Breeding
Elizabeth II took a keen interest in the breeding of her horses, and was the patron of the Thoroughbred Breeders' Association. She made regular visits to observe and assess her animals first hand from birth and beyond. Her horses are foaled at the Royal Stud in the Sandringham Estate in Norfolk, England. As yearlings, they are raised at Polhampton Stud in Hampshire, before being passed on to the training facilities of any one of seven trainers (as of 2018 season). Once they finish racing, they remain in her care into retirement or are sold at various bloodstock sales. Her bloodstock and racing adviser is John Warren, who took over the role from his father in law, Henry Herbert, 7th Earl of Carnarvon, on his death in 2001. He had held the post since 1969.

As well as thoroughbreds, Elizabeth also bred Shetland ponies at Balmoral in Scotland and Fell ponies at Hampton Court. In 2007 she opened a full-time Highland pony stud at Balmoral to enhance and preserve the breed.

Pageants and shows
Elizabeth II hosted the Royal Windsor Horse Show every year in Windsor Park, part of the royal estate in Berkshire. In her Diamond Jubilee year, an evening horse themed Diamond Jubilee Pageant was combined with the daytime show.

Equestrian statues
Elizabeth II is depicted on horseback in statues in these places:
 Ottawa, Canada (Parliament Hill, unveiled 1992)
 Windsor, England (Great Park, unveiled 2003)
 Regina, Canada (Legislative Building, unveiled 2005)

Documentaries
In 1974, Elizabeth II's interest in horses was the subject of a documentary title, The Queen's Race Horses: a Private View, which she herself narrated. In 2013, as part of the 60th Anniversary Coronation celebrations, Clare Balding presented the BBC Documentary, The Queen: a Passion for Horses.

See also
 Queen Victoria's pets
 Royal corgis
 List of historical horses

Notes

References
 All the Queen's Horses: Trooping the Colour 1947-1986

Elizabeth II
Horses